Erndtebrück is a municipality in the Siegen-Wittgenstein district, in North Rhine-Westphalia, Germany.

Geography

Location
Erndtebrück situated on the river Eder in the Rothaargebirge, approx. 20 km northeast of Siegen.

Neighbouring communities
Erndtebrück borders on Netphen, the communities of Hilchenbach, Bad Berleburg, Bad Laasphe and Kirchhundem in the district of Olpe, and Schmallenberg in the Hochsauerlandkreis.

Constituent communities

Balde
Benfe
Birkefehl
Birkelbach
Röspe
Schameder
Womelsdorf
Zinse

History
Erndtebrück had its first documentary mention in 1256, celebrating 750 years of existence in 2006. The village was first known by the name Ermingardibruggern, and was the seat of a knightly family, and later a customs office with market rights.

Politics

Municipal council

The council's 22 seats are apportioned thus, in accordance with municipal elections held on 30 August 2009:
SPD 7 seats
CDU 7 seats
FDP 5 seats
UWG 3 seats
Note: UWG is a citizens' coalition.

Mayor
2004–2015: Karl-Ludwig Völkel (SPD)
2015–incumbent: Henning Gronau (SPD)

Coat of arms
Erndtebrück's civic coat of arms might heraldically be described thus: Party per fess, above in azure a bridge Or, below in argent two pallets sable.

The community was granted these arms in 1958. The bridge in the chief is a canting symbol, referring to Erndtebrück's last syllable (Brücke is "bridge" in German), but also to an actual bridge built over the river Eder at Erndtebrück in 1830. Below in the shield are the arms of the Counts of Wittgenstein.

Town partnerships
  Bergues, France, since 1973

Economy and infrastructure

Transport
The community is connected to its neighbours by Federal Highways (Bundesstraßen) 62 and 480. Furthermore, trains run on the Rothaar Railway to both Siegen and Bad Berleburg, and on the Upper Lahn Valley (Obere Lahntalbahn) to Marburg. Until 1944, there was also a rail connection to Altenhundem with the Erndtebrück-Altenhundem line, but this came to an end late in the Second World War as retreating German Army units blew its bridges up. Some of the tunnels along the line are still preserved.

Public institutions
Erndtebrück is home to the German Air Force's Reserve Range of Command 2 (Einsatzführungsbereich 2), formerly 5th Teaching Group of Technical School 1 (V. Lehrgruppe der Technischen Schule 1), the Air Force's programming centre for air defence and a health squad to take care of the airmen.

Personalities

Sons and daughters of the community
Wilhelm Busch (1861–1929), instrument builder and father of musicians and actors Fritz, Adolf, Willi, Hermann and Heinrich Busch.

References

External links

 Erndtebrück
 Photos of Erndtebrück's 750-year celebration (historical market, festive procession, closing fireworks)
 Schameder

Municipalities in North Rhine-Westphalia
Rothaar Mountains
Siegen-Wittgenstein
Installations of the German Air Force